The Federation of German Detectives: (German: Bund Deutscher Kriminalbeamter; BDK) is a professional association of criminal police officers in Germany. It was founded on 28 September in 1968 and represents about 15,000 people working in criminal investigation. The BDK cooperates with various national and international organizations such as Conseil Européen des Syndicats de Police (CESP) or Transparency International.

Chairpersons 
Since the founding there were the following chairpersons

 1969–1972: Johannes Reiter
 1972–1978: Rolf Grunert
 1978–1990: Ingo Herrmann
 1990–2003: Eike Bleibtreu
 2003–2011: Klaus Jansen
 2011–2018: André Schulz
 2018-2021: Sebastian Fiedler
 since 2021: Dirk Peglow

References 

Organisations based in Berlin
Trade unions established in 1968
Germany